Loso (Thai: โลโซ) are a Thai rock band fronted by singer–guitarist–composer Seksan Sukpimai (aka Sek Loso). The band was formed in 1994 in Bangkok, Thailand. Its name is derived from a play on hi-so, Thai slang for socialites and the upper class (from English 'high society'), and is meant to reflect the group's humble origins. It is one of the first Thai bands to achieve success on the international music scene, having played festivals, including South By Southwest and Glastonbury, and to be produced by a Western record producer. The group completed and released their first demo in late 1995. Loso disbanded in 2003, and afterwards, Seksan continued as Sek Loso up until November 2021 when they reformed.

History

First album
Within a year of its formation, Sek had written 10 songs. Two of the songs in collaboration with Marc de Sala, a Danish musician and producer living and working in Thailand. With drummer Kittisak "Yai" Khotkam (b. January 22, 1973) and bassist Apirath "Rath" Sukkhajitr (b. September 20, 1967), Sek recorded the tracks in a night in late 1995 and sent the demo tape to Asanee Chotikul of the popular Thai rock duo Asanee-Wasan. Called Lo Society, the band's demo tape was released as an album in 1996 on Asanee's indie record label and distributed by GMM Grammy, Thailand's biggest record company. It sold 1.5 million copies.

Celebrity status
Loso released eight more albums, each selling at least 1 million copies ("platinum" status on the RIAA certification scale), and some selling 3 million copies.

Among the band's most popular songs is "Som Sarn" (Thai: "ซมซาน" or "Hesitant"), which features an acoustic guitar intro that is widely recognized in Thailand. Another hit was Pantip, with its hook chorus, "ja mai pai Pantip" ("will not go Pantip" or "I won't go to Pantip"). The song is about a man dating a woman and taking her shopping at World Trade Center, MBK Center and Siam Square, but he refuses to take her to Pantip Plaza because his ex-girlfriend has a shop there.

The band's line up remained stable except for a period where Apirath was replaced by Nattaphon "Klang" Suntharaanu. Klang Loso played bass on the Rock & Roll and Losoland albums and toured with the band. Apirath Loso then returned to bass duties with the band until its demise.

Just about all the band's albums are accompanied by the release of a karaoke VCD, featuring music videos of the songs. Through the music videos and his appearance as pitchman for the M-150 brand energy drink, Sek Loso, usually wearing sunglasses, has achieved cultural icon status in Thailand. He even spoofed his celebrity image with a Sek lookalike making a cameo appearance in the 2005 Thai action film, Tom-Yum-Goong. The song that accompanies the M-150 commercials, the ballad "Teh Yang Thai" ("เท่อย่างไทย"), is another hit.

Going solo
After the release of the 2002 live album Loso Concert, Loso broke up, with Sek Loso becoming a solo act. Kittisak and Apirath formed a new band, Fahrenheit. Sek released his debut solo album, 7 August, in 2003 and duetted with veteran string and luk thung star Bird McIntyre, for the 2004 hit album, Bird Sek. The pair played sold-out concerts at Bangkok's Impact Arena.

Sek, meanwhile, had aspirations beyond the Thai music scene: In Thai music terminology, he wanted to "go inter". He had been reading biographies of his rock idol, Jimi Hendrix, and decided that to achieve international stardom he needed to go to England as Hendrix had. In 2004, he moved to London and enrolled in an ESOL school, and after six months of intensive learning, he could speak English with an upper-class British accent. He began writing songs in English and placed advertisements in NME for a bass player and drummer to form a new Loso, auditioning prospects by having them perform the entire Hendrix album, Are You Experienced.

20th Year Reunion
In September 2020, Loso classic lineup had been reunited to celebrate Seksan's wedding. 
In October 2021, Sek, Yai and Klang have started to rehearse together before announcing that they have reunited and will be playing future gigs soon.

Discography

Studio albums
 Lo-Society (1996)
 The Red Bike (1997, movie soundtrack)
 Entertainment (1998)
 Rock & Roll (2000)
 Losoland (2001)
 The Red Album (August 2001)

Compilation albums
 Lo-Society (Bonus Tracks, 1996)
 Best of Loso (CD, 1999)
 Best of Loso (Karaoke VCD, 2001)
 Loso: Concert for Friends (VCD, 2002)
 Loso: Best Of Collection'' (30 April 2013)

References

External links

Sek Loso @Facebook
LoSoFC @Blogspot
The official Sek Loso website from 2009 till 2016 @Wayback Machine
Sek Loso @Discogs

Thai rock music groups
Musical groups from Bangkok